City Market, also known as Farmers Market, is an historic public market located at 9 East Old Street in Petersburg, Virginia. It was built in 1878–1879 through a land given in trust by merchant Robert Balling. The City Market is an octagonal brick building.  It measures 93 feet in diameter and is surrounded by a large metal canopy supported on elaborate iron brackets. The market’s high-rafted interior was originally where perishables were sold, whereas the outside stalls were for produce.

It was added to the National Register of Historic Places in 1969.  It is located in the Petersburg Old Town Historic District.

References

External links

Old Farmers' Market, West Old & Rock Streets, Petersburg, Petersburg, VA: 4 photos, 4 measured drawings, and 10 data pages at Historic American Buildings Survey

Retail markets in the United States
Commercial buildings on the National Register of Historic Places in Virginia
National Register of Historic Places in Petersburg, Virginia
Octagonal buildings in the United States
Buildings and structures in Petersburg, Virginia
Commercial buildings completed in 1878
Historic American Buildings Survey in Virginia
Individually listed contributing properties to historic districts on the National Register in Virginia